Inspector Mergou is an Algerian computer-animated series produced by Not Found Prod Algerie in 2014, . It is considered the first Algerian computer-animated series ever made.

Description 
The Inspector "Mergou" is an Algerian private investigator who works on social crimes. He faces puzzles and solves them without revealing the answers to the audience, thereby encouraging them to participate in the game and identify the culprit from several suspects. Participation in the game is done by sending the answer via SMS. At the beginning of the next episode, the inspector "Mergou" reveals the identity of the culprit.

References

External links 
 NOT FOUND PROD

2010s Algerian television series
2014 Algerian television series debuts
2015 Algerian television series endings
Algerian animated television series
Computer-animated television series
Echorouk TV original programming